Mitch Thompson is a baseball coach and former player, who is the current head baseball coach of the Baylor Bears. He played college baseball at Cloud County Community College in 1984, transferring to Bacone College in 1985, before ultimately transferring to Fort Hays State where he played from 1986 to 1988. He served as the head coach of the McLennan Highlanders (2013–2022).

Playing career
Thompson grew up in Goodland, Kansas. He attended Cloud County Community College as a freshman. He would transfer to Bacone College for the 1985 season. Thompson made his final transfer to Fort Hays State University, where he was a two-time Academic All-American and a 1988 team captain.

Coaching career
Thompson began his coaching career as a graduate assistant for the Mississippi State Bulldogs. He moved to Virginia in 1991, working as a paid assistant for the Radford Highlanders. He returned to Mississippi State for the 1992 and 1993 seasons. He would also join the Auburn Tigers for a season in 1994.

Thompson joined Steve Smith's staff as the hitting coach of the Baylor Bears in 1995, where he finally found a long-term home. After 15 years on Smith's staff, he was promoted to Assistant head coach. Following the 2013 season, he accepted the head coaching position at McLennan Community College.

On June 15, 2022, Thompson was named the head coach of the Baylor Bears.

Head coaching record

References

External links
Baylor Bears bio

Living people
Auburn Tigers baseball coaches
Bacone Warriors baseball players
Baylor Bears baseball coaches
Cloud County Thunderbirds baseball players
Fort Hays State Tigers baseball players
McLennan Highlanders baseball coaches
Mississippi State Bulldogs baseball coaches
Radford Highlanders baseball coaches
Year of birth missing (living people)
Mississippi State University alumni
Baseball coaches from Kansas
People from Goodland, Kansas